The Law on Public Education is a provincial law of Quebec which legislates the Québécois public education system. It is under the responsibility of the Minister of Education of Quebec.

The legislation originated in 1801. The current law was adopted in 1988, resulting from the modernization of several old school laws adopted in 1829, 1867, and 1964.

External links
 Loi sur l'instruction publique, Éditeur officiel du Québec

Quebec law